Borowa  is a village in the administrative district of Gmina Dobryszyce, within Radomsko County, Łódź Voivodeship, in central Poland.

The village has a population of 150.

References

Borowa